Takahisa (written: 貴久, 貴永, 敬久, 孝久, 高久 or 隆久) is a masculine Japanese given name. Notable people with the name include:

, Japanese motorcycle trials rider
, Japanese United Nations official
, Japanese idol and actor
, Japanese footballer
, Japanese luger
, Japanese daimyō
, Japanese samurai
, Japanese high jumper
, Japanese film director and screenwriter

Fictional Characters 
Takahisa, the protagonist of horror manga series Freak Island

Japanese masculine given names